During the Round-Up is a 1913 American short silent Western film directed by Christy Cabanne and featuring Lillian Gish.

Cast
 Frank Opperman as The Ranchero
 Lillian Gish as The Ranchero's Daughter
 Henry B. Walthall as The Stranger
 William A. Carroll as The Mexican
 Fred Burns (actor) as The Foreman
 Bob Burns as The Foreman's Brother (as Robert Burns)

See also
 List of American films of 1913
 Lillian Gish filmography

References

External links
 

1913 films
1913 Western (genre) films
1913 short films
American silent short films
American black-and-white films
Films directed by Christy Cabanne
Silent American Western (genre) films
1910s American films